"The Rejected" is the fourth episode of the fourth season of the American television drama series Mad Men, and the 43rd overall episode of the series. It was written by Keith Huff and series creator and executive producer Matthew Weiner, and directed by John Slattery, who portrays Roger Sterling on the show. It originally aired  on the AMC channel in the United States on August 15, 2010. Reviews of the episode were generally positive, emphasizing particularly the emotional tension between Pete Campbell (Vincent Kartheiser) and Peggy Olson (Elisabeth Moss).

Plot
In February 1965, reformed alcoholic Freddy Rumsen (Joel Murray) has returned to Sterling Cooper Draper Pryce after a several year absence, working freelance and primarily trying to help Peggy Olson (Elisabeth Moss). He has delivered Ponds Cold Cream to the agency but does not want Pete Campbell (Vincent Kartheiser) - who previously got Freddy fired when Pete informed Roger Sterling (John Slattery) that Freddy peed his pants years before - to work on the account. Ponds complains to Roger that they feel Clearasil is their main competition (even though Clearasil is an acne cream aimed at teens and Ponds is a cold cream aimed at women). Roger orders Pete to tell his father-in-law Tom Vogel (Joe O'Connor), a high-level executive at the Vicks Chemical Company that SCDP needs to drop the Clearasil account because it represents a conflict of interest, and Ponds bills more. Pete is worried this will affect his already-rocky relationship with Tom and diminish his standing at the firm.

Pete telephones Tom and tells him he has something to tell him, arranging to meet at a bar. They both show up early, and a very nervous Pete is afraid to tell him they are dropping Clearasil.  As Pete starts to speak, Tom says: "You crazy kids!"  Pete is confused, and then stunned, when Tom informs him Trudy  is pregnant, only realizing afterward that Pete didn't know.  Pete is so shocked that he tells Tom they are changing the creative on the Clearasil account. When Pete arrives home, Trudy is crestfallen over how Pete heard the news (she wanted to wait until their (fifth) wedding anniversary to surprise Pete, but he is simply overjoyed at the news.

Dr. Faye Miller (Cara Buono) is conducting interviews with single women about their beauty regimens and what products they use to keep beautiful. However, the discussion quickly turns to men treating them badly. In this group is Don's secretary Allison (Alexa Alemanni).  Weeks earlier, a drunken Don seduced Allison at his apartment; since then, he has acted strictly professionally toward her, which Allison has taken as brusque and dismissive. Allison feels hurt and used by Don and grows emotional during the meeting. Don, Peggy, and Freddy are watching the women through a two-way mirror and Allison, knowing Don is behind it, looks directly at him, making him uneasy. She soon runs out of the session in tears. Peggy, who was also once Don's secretary, tries to comfort Allison, who is angry that men always take what they want and get away with it; she insinuates that she thinks Peggy also slept with Don and used this as leverage to get herself promoted to copywriter. Peggy, offended, tells Allison: "Your problem is not my problem ... Get over it!"

Pete and Harry Crane have lunch with Ken Cosgrove (Aaron Staton), who is engaged to the daughter of Corning's CFO.  When Harry leaves to take a call, Ken says his fiancée knows Trudy from a garden club and demands that Pete stop bad-mouthing him behind his back.  Pete denies the accusation, telling him it is the sort of thing Harry would do.  Ken has been shifting from firm to firm since the collapse of Sterling Cooper but expresses dissatisfaction with where he is now.  Pete subtly insinuates he might do well to hire on with Sterling Cooper Draper Pryce.

Allison informs Don that what happened between them was a mistake, and she is leaving.  She asks for a letter of recommendation so she can find a job elsewhere. Don tries to dissuade her, but she wants a change. He offers to let Allison type her own letter on his stationery, and he will sign it. Allison takes this as indifference on Don's part and throws a brass cigarette dispenser at him, smashing some framed prints on the wall.  The noise startles several employees, who lean into the hall to see Allison storm off.  Peggy even stands on her desk to peek through the shared glass partition into Don's office.  Don tells Joan to get him a new secretary, then immediately starts to get drunk and doesn't leave the office until late.  The next day, he finds that Allison has been replaced by Bert Cooper's former secretary, the aged Miss Ida Blankenship (Randee Heller).

Peggy makes friends with a young photo editor at Life magazine named Joyce Ramsay (Zosia Mamet), who also works in the Time-Life Building. One day, Peggy is called out to reception at work, where Joyce invites Peggy to a party at a sweatshop converted into a loft, and Peggy says she'll come. After Joyce heads back, receptionist Megan Calvet (Jessica Paré) seems to dislike Joyce, suggesting that she is a bit pretentious. Peggy pretends to agree, although she clearly has taken a liking to Joyce. Later, at the party, Joyce introduces Peggy to her friends, who are a group of marijuana-smoking bohemian artists. Peggy fields a pass by Joyce, who seems to be lesbian, but finds herself attracted to Abe Drexler (Charlie Hofheimer), an abrasive yet charming underground newspaper writer, whom she soon kisses while the pair are hiding out from a raid which police have launched on the building. When the coast is clear, Peggy and Joyce escape down the street, laughing.

Pete decides to "force Tom's hand" and wants his father-in-law to give him the entire Vick's Chemical account, with advertising billings worth over US$6 million (equivalent to US$ million in ). Tom would also have to transfer Clearasil to another agency so it wouldn't conflict with Pond's. Tom is angry, yet impressed, at what he considers blackmail. While Trudy and Tom's wife are looking at the future nursery room in Pete's apartment, Tom mumbles "son-of-a-bitch" at Pete's back, which is turned while Pete pours drinks. Pete just shrugs. He later informs Lane Pryce that they will be handling Vicks, and so the firm can drop Clearasil.

A secretary comes into a break room where Peggy and Joey Baird (Matt Long) are sitting. She wants them to sign a greeting card, and Peggy thinks it is for Pete's bringing in such a big and prestigious account. Peggy is shocked when she sees the card has a stork on it and realizes it is for Trudy's pregnancy.  The rest of the staff is unaware that Pete impregnated Peggy the night before his wedding, exactly five years previously. Peggy does not sign the card and instead goes into Pete's office. Pete thinks she's there to congratulate him on Vicks Chemicals, but instead she says: "Congratulations about the baby." Pete thanks her before remembering that Peggy had given up their son a few years earlier; her awkward statements render Pete at a loss for words. Peggy walks back to her office, trying to catch her breath, and bangs her head on her desk several times.

Dr. Miller enters Don's office and announces the results of the Pond's focus group. She reports that the best strategy for marketing Pond's is to tap into young women's desire to get married - essentially, to imply Pond's will improve their marriageability. Don rejects this strategy as old-fashioned: "Welcome to 1925." His skepticism about Dr. Miller's psychological approach, hinted at in previous episodes, boils over, and he dismisses her role in the creative process as useless and intrusive. He says that his job is not to pander to emotions but rather to enable people to experience new emotions they did not realize they had. Clearly miffed, an offended Dr. Miller leaves.

Peggy is lying on her couch when Joyce telephones Peggy to meet her and her beatnik friends in the lobby for lunch. Meanwhile, Pete is waiting in the lobby with Roger and important executives from Vicks Chemicals for a lunch meeting. Peggy, while waiting outside SCDP's glass doors with her young, artsy friends, looks through the glass at Pete, standing with the older men in suits. Pete catches her looking at him, and the two share a moment, thinking of their past connection, sharing a private smile before finally leaving each other's sight.

Production
John Slattery, who portrays Roger Sterling on the show, directed this episode. This is Slattery's first work as a director.

Reception
On its original American broadcast on August 15, 2010, on AMC, the episode was viewed by 2.05 million people.

The episode received positive reviews from critics. David Zurawik of The Baltimore Sun emphasized the "moment of poignancy that didn't seem forced" between Peggy and Pete towards the end of the episode, after she found out about his wife's pregnancy. Zurawik found this a welcome relief from the "Don Draper TV-phony existentialism" that had dominated the season so far. Noel Murray, reviewing the episode for The A.V. Club, gave it a grade "A−". Murray liked the episode "a lot", and pointed to the scene with Peggy and Pete as the episode's highlight. At the same time he also voiced concerns that "Weiner’s stubborn insistence on keeping Don a lost soul could lead to creative stagnation". Mark Dawidziak, of the Cleveland newspaper The Plain Dealer, also highlighted the "poignant and telling glances" exchanged between Peggy and Pete, providing an "emotional payoff punch" to the episode.

References

External links
 

Mad Men (season 4) episodes
2010 American television episodes